Ricardo A. Baeza-Yates (born March 21, 1961) is a Chilean-Catalan computer scientist that currently is a Research Professor at the Institute for Experiential AI of Northeastern University in the Silicon Valley campus. He is also part-time professor at Universitat Pompeu Fabra in Barcelona and Universidad de Chile in Santiago. He is an expert member of the Global Partnership on Artificial Intelligence, a member of Spain's Advisory Council on AI, and a member of the Association for Computing Machinery's US Technology Policy Subcommittee on AI and Algorithms.

From June 2016 until June 2020 he was CTO of NTENT, a semantic search technology company. Before, until February 2016, he was VP of Research for Yahoo! Labs, leading teams in United States, Europe and Latin America.

He obtained a Ph.D. from the University of Waterloo with Efficient Text Searching, supervised by Gaston Gonnet and granted in 1989.

His research interests include:

 Algorithms and data structures. His contributions include algorithms for string search such as the Shift Or Algorithm and algorithms for Fuzzy string searching, inspiring also the Bitap algorithm; co-author of the Handbook of Algorithms and Data Structures  with his former Ph.D. advisor Gaston Gonnet,
 Information retrieval. Co-author of Modern Information retrieval Addison Wesley, first edition in 1999 and a second edition in 2011 that won the 2012 book of the year award of the  Association for Information Science and Technology.
 Web search and mining. Baeza-Yates founded in 2002 and directed until 2005 the Center for Web Research in the Department of Computer Science of the University of Chile. His latest work on this area focuses on bias on the Web, giving the Gödel Lecture 2017 in Viena.

Dr. Baeza-Yates was awarded one of the Spanish national Computer Science awards in 2018
as well as the J.W. Graham Medal in Computing and Innovation by the University of Waterloo, Canada, in 2007. 
In August 2008, Dr. Baeza-Yates was proposed for the first time to the Chilean National Prize in Applied Sciences (Premio Nacional de Ciencias Aplicadas). He has been proposed again most of even years when this award is given.
He is corresponding member of the Chilean Academy of Sciences (2003), founding member of the Chilean Academy of Engineering (2010), and corresponding member of the Brazilian Academy of Sciences (2018).
He is an ACM Fellow (2009). and an IEEE Fellow (2011).

See also
 List of University of Waterloo people

References

External links
 
 
 
 Publications in DBLP
 Website of Modern Information Retrieval, 2nd. edition, Addison Wesley, 2011
 Cómo funciona la web (2008) Full text in the Electronic Books Portal of the University of Chile

Chilean computer scientists
Spanish computer scientists
Yahoo! employees
Fellows of the Association for Computing Machinery
Fellow Members of the IEEE
1961 births
Living people
J.W. Graham Medal awardees